Salvador Meliá (born 1 April 1977) is a Spanish former track cyclist. He competed at the 2000 Summer Olympics and the 2004 Summer Olympics.

References

External links
 

1977 births
Living people
Spanish male cyclists
Olympic cyclists of Spain
Cyclists at the 2000 Summer Olympics
Cyclists at the 2004 Summer Olympics
Sportspeople from Valencia
Cyclists from the Valencian Community